Gaje Ghale VC (1 August 1918 – 28 March 2000) was a Nepalese Gurkha recipient of the Victoria Cross, the highest and most prestigious award for gallantry in the face of the enemy that can be awarded to British and Commonwealth forces.

Biography

Ghale was born in the Gorkha district of Nepal. He joined the British Indian Army in 1934. Ghale was 22 years old, and a Havildar in the 2nd Battalion of the 5th Royal Gurkha Rifles in the Indian Army during World War II when the following deed took place, for which he was awarded the VC. His medal citation reads:

Ghale was subsequently commissioned as a jemadar (war-substantive subedar) and continued to serve in the Indian Army post-1947. He was promoted substantive subedar on 20 February 1948, retiring as an Hon. Captain.

See also
List of Brigade of Gurkhas recipients of the Victoria Cross

Notes

Gaje Ghale, VC, The Times, 30 March 2000. Retrieved 10 October 2009.

External links
Obituary of Captain Gaje Ghale, VC, The daily Telegraph, 30 March 2000
News Item (obituary)
Gaje Ghale

Nepalese World War II recipients of the Victoria Cross
Indian Army officers
1922 births
2000 deaths
Nepalese people of World War II
Gurkhas
People from Gorkha District
Indian Army personnel of World War II
Recipients of the Order of the Star of Nepal
British Indian Army soldiers